Eduardo Guillermo Castillo Vigoroux (born 25 June 1950) is a Chilean lawyer who was elected as a member of the Chilean Constitutional Convention.

In 2013, he was appointed as dean of the Faculty of Law of the Universidad Católica de Temuco.

References

External links
 Profile at Chile Constituyentes

Living people
1951 births
21st-century Chilean politicians
University of Chile alumni
Party for Democracy (Chile) politicians
Members of the Chilean Constitutional Convention
People from Santiago